Kuk is a small settlement above the right bank of the upper course of the Bača River in the Municipality of Tolmin in the Littoral region of Slovenia.

References

External links

Kuk on Geopedia

Populated places in the Municipality of Tolmin